Twomile Creek is a stream in the U.S. state of Georgia. It is a tributary to the Chattahoochee River.

Twomile Creek was so named on account of its distance,  from the Middle Cherokee Trading Path. Sometimes the name is spelled out "Two Mile Creek".

References

Rivers of Georgia (U.S. state)
Rivers of Forsyth County, Georgia